Captain Mahendra Nath Mulla, MVC (15 May 1926 – 9 December 1971) was an officer of the Indian Navy.

Early life
Mulla was born on 15 May 1926 in a Kashmiri family in Gorakhpur, Uttar Pradesh to T. N. Mulla in a family well-known in Allahabad judicial circles. He joined the Royal Indian Navy as a cadet in January 1946 and underwent training in the United Kingdom.

Military career
Mulla was commissioned in the Royal Indian Navy on 1 May 1948. He was promoted to Lieutenant Commander on 16 September 1958. In April 1961, he was selected to attend the Defence Services Staff College, Wellington. He was promoted to the rank of Commander on 30 June 1964. He served on the Hunt-class destroyer  and the Bathurst-class Minesweeper . He also served as the executive officer of the Black Swan-class sloop  and commanded the R-class destroyer .

He served as the Deputy Naval Adviser to the High Commissioner of India to the United Kingdom from 1965 to 1967.

Indo-Pakistani War of 1971
During the 1971 War, Mulla was commanding the 14th anti submarine squadron, a task force which formed part of the Western Fleet. The squadron was assigned the task of hunting and destroying enemy submarines in the North Arabian Sea. He issued orders for the ship to be abandoned because it was sinking. He chose to go down with the ship in the highest traditions of the Indian Navy. Mulla was decorated with the Maha Vir Chakra, the second-highest gallantry award.

The citation for the Maha Vir Chakra reads as follows:

Legacy

Mulla was regarded among the finest seamen in the Navy and  highly-intelligent officer. On 28 January 2000, the Prime Minister of India Atal Bihari Vajpayee released a commemorative postage stamp issued by India Post paying tribute to Mulla.

A memorial for the tribute to Mulla and other martyred sailors exists at Diu . The memorial constitutes a full-scale model of INS Khukri encased in a glass house, placed on a hillock facing the sea. The Captain M. N. Mulla Auditorium, at Navy Nagar, Colaba in Mumbai, is named after him. A bust of Capt. Mulla stands in the foyer. The then Chief of the Naval Staff Admiral Madhvendra Singh inaugurated the auditorium.

In Selection Centre South (SCS), Banglore, there is a hall named Capt.(IN) MN Mulla Hall after Capt. MN Mulla, MVC.

An auditorium at the DSSC Wellington is also named after him.

References

Further reading

External links 

 Bharat Rakshak
  India Defence
 
  Orbat
 Magalorean
 PrideofIndia

Indian military personnel killed in action
Indian Navy officers
Recipients of the Maha Vir Chakra
People of the Indo-Pakistani War of 1971
1926 births
1971 deaths
Indian military personnel of the Indo-Pakistani War of 1971
Captains who went down with the ship
Royal Indian Navy officers
Defence Services Staff College alumni